Fanmi is a Canadian short drama film, directed by Sandrine Brodeur-Desrosiers and Carmine Pierre-Dufour and released in 2021. The film stars Mireille Metellus and Marie-Évelyne Lessard as Monique and Martine, a mother and daughter who are supporting each other through difficult times as Martine's partner Simon has recently committed suicide, while Monique is awaiting the results of medical tests to determine whether or not she has a serious illness.

The film was included in Telefilm Canada's Not Short on Talent program in the industry film market of the Clermont-Ferrand International Short Film Festival in 2021, but was not screened for the general public. It had its public premiere at the 2021 Toronto International Film Festival.

The film was named to TIFF's annual year-end Canada's Top Ten list for 2021. It was a Canadian Screen Award nominee for Best Live Action Short Drama at the 10th Canadian Screen Awards, and a Prix Iris nominee for Best Live Action Short Film at the 24th Quebec Cinema Awards.

References

External links
 

2021 films
2021 short films
Canadian drama short films
Black Canadian films
Films shot in Montreal
Films set in Montreal
French-language Canadian films
2020s Canadian films